is a passenger railway station located in the city of Takamatsu, Kagawa Prefecture, Japan. It is operated by JR Shikoku and has the station number "T26".

Lines
The station is served by the JR Shikoku Kōtoku Line and is located 3.2 km from the beginning of the line at Takamatsu. Only local services stop at the station.

Layout
Ritsurin-Kōen-Kitaguchi Station consists of a side platform serving a single elevated track. There is no station building and the station is unstaffed but a shelter is provided on the platform for waiting passengers and automatic ticket vending machines are installed. A ramp leads up to the platform from the access road. Parking for cars and bicycles is available under the elevated structure.

History
Japanese National Railways (JNR) opened Ritsurin-Kōen-Kitaguchi Station on 1 November 1986 as a temporary stop on the existing Kōtoku Line. With the privatization of JNR on 1 April 1987, JR Shikoku assumed control and the stop was upgraded to a full station.

Surrounding area
 Ritsurin Garden
 Iwashio Hachiman Shrine
 Eimei High School

See also
List of railway stations in Japan

References

External links

Station timetable

Railway stations in Kagawa Prefecture
Railway stations in Japan opened in 1986
Railway stations in Takamatsu